The Hip Hop Hall of Fame, also known as the Hip Hop Hall of Fame + Museum, is a New York chartered non-profit 501 c(3) museum and educational institution whose focus is hip hop music and culture from around the world.

History

The Hip Hop Hall of Fame was founded in 1992 by Hip Hop Hall of Fame Awards creator and executive producer James 'JT' Thompson, a New York City native and Los Angeles-raised hip hop connoisseur. The Hip Hop Hall of Fame was launched globally in September 1995 at Harlem's historic restaurant Sylvia's, which unveiled the plans for the museum, educational programs, and the BET Cable Network deal for the inaugural Hip Hop Hall of Fame Awards TV Show. The event was attended by hip hop forefather DJ Kool Herc, Grandmaster Caz, PebbleePoo, DLB of the Fearless Four, DJ Tony Tone, LA Sunshine of the Treacherous Three, Hip Hop Original Radio Deejays Mr. Magic and Kool DJ Red Alert, DJ Lord Yoda X, Easy AD of the Cold Crush Brothers, Pee Wee Dance, and more hip hop figures.

The Hip Hop Hall of Fame Museum was to be funded by the Hip Hop Hall of Fame Awards TV Shows after broadcasting on BET, produced with Juanita Williams of Dove Entertainment in the mid 1990s, modeled after the Rock n Roll Hall of Fame model. However, due to the media-hyped artist beefs that led to the tragic deaths of Tupac Shakur and the Notorious BIG after the show broadcasts, the Hip Hop Hall of Fame + Museum lost advertisers and sponsorship clients and could not return to the airwaves during that era, putting the museum building plans on hiatus. The Hip Hop Hall of Fame also attempted a re-launch in Los Angeles in 1997 that featured Kurtis Blow, Prince Whipper Whip of the Fantastic Five, Grandmaster Caz of the Cold Crush Brothers, founder and executive producer James 'JT' Thompson, The Watts Prophets, The Legendary Actor – Rapper 'Dolemite', Dominique DiPrima of The Beat & KJLH Radio, and more film and television personalities, but the awards still could not return to television until 2014.

Museum
The official Hip Hop Hall of Fame Museum offices are currently headquartered in Harlem, New York City however no physical Hall of Fame exists. Its community space is scheduled to feature hip hop art, music, digital video, dance, and community event space for its educational outreach with its partner organizations.

The new development project to house the Hip Hop Hall of Fame + Museum and a hotel entertainment complex is set to be built in a new Harlem location on 125th street. The 20-story facility as designed will include the actual Hall of Fame, a gift store, arcade, TV broadcast studios, a sports bar, restaurant and concert venue producing over 100 events annually. The Hip Hop Hall of Fame educational programming will include a youth arts and media training academy and will accommodate over 25,000 NYC public school kids on educational field trips and programs annually. The complex was scheduled for phase one in 2018 but that did not occur.

Inductions
The Hip Hop Hall of Fame has held inductions in the 1990s on BET, and in 2014 from Stage 48 hosted by hip hop icon Roxanne Shante in NYC broadcast on Soul of the South TV network. The Hip Hop Hall of Fame holds its annual induction ceremony every November during Hip Hop History Month in New York City. Artists and culture element contributors are eligible for induction after 20 years from their initial record release, and contributors based upon merit and impact on hip hop music and culture that includes MCs, DJs, graffiti artworks, B-Boys/Girls dancers, executives, producers, labels, fashion, business, scholarship, and community.

1990s class inductions
Kool Herc
Grandmaster Flash
Run-DMC & Jam Master Jay
DJ Red Alert

2010s class inductions
The Sugarhill Gang
The Sequence 
The Mercedes Ladies
Wild Style/Charlie Ahearn
Chiefrocker Busy Bee
Mr. Magic
Cornbread
Stay High 149
The N-Twins
Ralph McDaniels
DJ Hollywood

See also
 List of music museums

References

External links
 Hip Hop Hall of Fame

Proposed museums in the United States
Non-profit organizations based in New York City
Hip hop awards
Music halls of fame
Halls of fame in New York City
African-American museums in New York City
Proposed buildings and structures in New York (state)
Proposed buildings and structures in New York City